(), often corrupted to  or  in daily speech, was an Ottoman Turkish title meaning "steward, deputy, lieutenant". It derives from the Persian word  ("master of a household", later "chieftain, headman").

The term originated in medieval Persia. Under the Ilkhanids, the term  referred to a village elder who acted as its representative towards the government, and later, under the Safavids, their duties included the collection of taxes and administration of their village or town. From Persian practice it spread to the Seljuk Turks of the Sultanate of Rum, and is first attested in Ottoman usage in the 15th century in the sense of an "authorised deputy official".

At the same time, the Persian institution of s as village or town chiefs, also continued under the Ottoman Empire, until it was abolished until 1790. The system was also extended to nomadic tribes; originally, while chieftainship was hereditary, the tribe chieftain appointed s over the subordinate clans, while later the clans chose one of their own number to act in this capacity.

References

Sources 
 

Ottoman titles
Turkish words and phrases